Dan Biggin, more commonly known professionally as Danny B, is a Chilean guitarist and bassist performing with thrash band Criminal, death metal band Pentagram Chile and is also involved in his own side projects Takoma Star (punk rock) and Flight 19 (instrumental – avant garde) to name a few.

Biography
Danny B is a record producer, mix engineer, mastering engineer and live sound engineer of growing notoriety and owner of HVR Recording Studios in Suffolk, U.K. where he has produced bands such as Pentagram Chile, Criminal , Agonyst, Brainchoke, Beef Conspiracy and Lock Up to name a few as well as working with now legendary NWOBHM artists Trespass. He has also recently been resurrecting the back catalogue of cult record label Cacophonous Records by remastering seminal albums from bands such as Sigh , Dimmu Borgir , Bal_Sagoth and Gehennah.

As well as producing the last three Criminal albums 'White Hell', 'Akelarre' and 'Fear Itself' he recently completed work on the first ever full length by Pentagram (more than 20 years after their initial break up) and new albums by 1980s thrashers Anihilated.

As a live musician he has performed all over the world either playing guitar (his main instrument) or bass with bands such as Criminal, Pentagram Chile, Annihilated, Trespass, Takoma Star and recently filling in under the name 'El Sucio' for notorious metal super group Brujeria and has supported Metallica , Megadeth and Alice-in-Chains to name a few.

Recently he has started making the move back into live sound engineering (which is where he initially started his career) and alongside the studio he completed a short summer tour in Europe doing front of house sound for American Nu-Metal band Ill Niño finishing up at Hellfest (French music festival) on the main stage followed by a short run of shows in Australia. He was also front of house sound engineer for Devilment (the new band of Cradle of Filth frontman Dani Filth ) on the main stage at the 2017 edition of Bloodstock Open Air

He was then working on a full world tour for Cradle of Filth in a dual role as Tour Manager and Front of House Sound Engineer as the band embarked on its most ambitious world tour in years playing all across Europe, Russia, Israel, South America, Mexico, The United States, Canada, Indonesia, Japan, The Philippines and Australia finishing their run with performances on the main stage at Download Festival at Donnington and With Full Force festival in Germany.

Cradle of Filth then almost immediately went out on a second run around the world making, as reported by Danny B on his personal Instagram, a new two year personal record of 227 shows in 45 countries.
In those two years he played shows with Criminal and Brujeria as well as mixing live sound for Cradle of Filth , Devilment and two tours with Wednesday 13 plus one show mixing Body Count the band of Hip hop legend and actor Ice-T on the main stage at Wacken Open Air

Discography (as musician)

N.C.A. (guitars)
 "Something for the weakened" E.P. (2014) – Unreleased

Anihilated (guitars) (2013–2017)
 "Anti Social Engineering" (2015) – 7th Vile Records

Criminal (bass) (2006–present)
 White Hell (2009) – Massacre Records	 
 Akelarre (2011) – Massacre Records
 "Fear Itself" (2016) – Metal Blade Records

Pentagram (bass) (2009 (live), 2011–present)
 "Demented" Split 7" with Master
 The Malefice (2013)
 "Ritual Human Sacrifice" (2015)

Takoma Star (vocals and guitars) (2006–present)
 "To This Day E.P." (2007)
 "Stockholm" – single (2008)
 "Live O.B.S. Vol. 1" (2009)
 "Till The Fall" (2009)
 "The Action Goes Here E.P." (2014) – Unreleased

References

External links
 
 
 
 
 

1980 births
Living people
Chilean guitarists
Chilean male guitarists
Chilean record producers
21st-century guitarists
21st-century male musicians